Marleine Gaile English (January 4, 1935 – December 10, 2012) was an American film actress during the 1950s.

Early years
She was born Marleine Gaile English in San Diego, California. As a teenager, she worked as a model and performed locally.

Film career
English was originally signed to a contract by Paramount Pictures in 1952 after winning a San Diego beauty pageant to be "Fairest of the Fair". She was paid $150 per week to appear in such films as Red Garters (1954) and Rear Window (1954). Even though her scenes were often cut during the final editing of those and other films, English's contract rose to $200 a week. Her breakthrough role came when producer Aubrey Schenck borrowed her from Paramount to appear in his film noir production Shield for Murder (1954) starring Edmond O'Brien.

The Mountain and later films
English received a major break in 1955, when she was cast opposite Spencer Tracy in The Mountain, a mountain-climbing drama that was to be filmed on location in the French Alps. Unfortunately, English was given a smallpox vaccine before departing the United States for France. She soon developed a very high fever and decided to leave the production, a move that prompted Paramount to suspend her and replace her with Barbara Darrow. In a later interview with the actress, Parade questioned English about that decision. She said it was a very dumb move, and she was unsure why she did it. One of the actress's close relatives, however, told the publication that the true story was that English had fallen in love with Paramount actor Larry Pennell, and she became enraged when the studio would not cast Pennell in the film, hoping they could work together in France.

English made mostly B films throughout her career in Hollywood. In 1955, she performed with John Ireland and Pennell in Hell's Horizon. Some other films in which she was cast in this period include Three Bad Sisters (1956), Runaway Daughters (1956), The She Creature (1956), and Flesh and the Spur (1956). She and Suzanne Alexander were the finalists for the role of Princess Aouda in Around the World in 80 Days (1956) after Shirley MacLaine rejected it twice. But MacLaine later got the role after she reconsidered it.

Personal life and death
After costarring with Tom Conway and Mike Connors in the horror film Voodoo Woman (1957), English married San Diego businessman Allen Paul Sutherland. She then retired from acting at the age of just 21. They had a daughter and four sons.

English died of cancer at age 77 in Tucson, Arizona in December 2012; her husband Paul Sutherland died five years later. Their graves are in Marana Cemetery in Marana, Arizona, which is located 24 miles northwest of Tucson.

Filmography
Casanova's Big Night (1954) – Girl on Bridge (uncredited)
Yankee Pasha (1954) – Harem Girl (uncredited)
About Mrs. Leslie (1954) – Minor Role (uncredited)
Living It Up (1954) – Manicurist (uncredited)
Rear Window (1954) – Girl at Songwriter's Party (uncredited)
Shield for Murder (1954) – Patty Winters
Desert Sands (1955) – Princess Zara
Hell's Horizon (1955) – Sammi
Three Bad Sisters (1956) – Vicki Craig
The George Burns and Gracie Allen Show (1956, TV Series) – Myia
The Bob Cummings Show (1956, TV Series) – Marie / Marie de Carlo
Crossroads (1956, TV Series) – Barbara Sherman
The She-Creature (1956, for AIP) – Andrea Talbott / Elizabeth Wetherby
A Strange Adventure (1956) – Lynn Novak
Flesh and the Spur (1956, for AIP) – Wild Willow
Runaway Daughters (1956, for AIP) – Audrey Barton aka Lola Marshall
Voodoo Woman (1957, for AIP) – Marilyn Blanchard (final film role)

See also
 "Louella Parsons Reports From Hollywood", North Carolina Daily Independent (Kannapolis, North Carolina), March 4, 1956, p. 22.
 "People In The News", Nebraska Sunday Journal and Star (Lincoln, Nebraska), July 22, 1956, p. 6.

References

External links
 
 Marla English at Brian's Drive In Theatre

1935 births
2012 deaths
20th-century American actresses
21st-century American women
American film actresses
Actresses from San Diego
Deaths from cancer in Arizona
Paramount Pictures contract players